The R820 road is a regional road in Dublin, Ireland.

The official definition of the R820 from the Roads Act 1993 (Classification of Regional Roads) Order 2006 states:

R820: Rathmines - Milltown, Dublin

Between its junction with R114 at Rathgar Road and its junction with R117 at Dundrum Road via Rathmines Road Upper, Dartry Road and Milltown Road all in the city of Dublin.</p>

See also
Roads in Ireland
National primary road
National secondary road
Regional road

References

Regional roads in the Republic of Ireland
Roads in County Dublin